"It Doesn't Matter Anymore" is a song written by Paul Anka and recorded by Buddy Holly.

It Doesn't Matter Anymore may refer to:

It Doesn't Matter Anymore (album), by The Supernaturals
"It Doesn't Matter Anymore", a song by Puressence from the album Only Forever
"(You Know) It Doesn't Matter Anymore", a song by Daryl Hall & John Oates from their self-titled album

See also
It Doesn't Matter (disambiguation)